Gracia Maria Robin was the daughter of a wealthy French merchant, Jean Baptiste Robin, in Smyrna, Ottoman Empire, in what is now Turkey. Her name has erroneously been recorded in places as Dura Bin, a mis-transcription of 'du Robin'. She married Dr. Andrew Turnbull, a former British Consul at Smyrna, who organized the largest attempt at British colonization in the New World by founding New Smyrnea, Florida, named in honor of Gracia's birthplace.

It was reported that besides the Greeks living in Greece, and in Asia Minor, there were many Greeks settled in Menorca, and that the English felt the Turkish rulers of Greece would not object if the English enticed Greeks to leave their homeland for a new country and in hopes of a better life.

References

Year of birth missing
Year of death missing
People of pre-statehood Florida